Harry Bassi (born 26 November 1969) is a former Scottish rugby union player, normally playing at Centre or Fullback.

Rugby Union career

Amateur career

At the amateur level Bassi played for Glasgow High Kelvinside. After GHK merged with Glasgow Academicals to form Glasgow Hawks Bassi continued to play for the Hawks team.

Provincial and professional career

His career spanned the amateur era and the professional era and Bassi represented Glasgow District at various levels before finally representing the professional Glasgow side, now Glasgow Warriors.

He represented Glasgow District's Schools while attending Kelvinside Academy.

He was selected for the Under-21 Glasgow District side.

At the professional level Harry Bassi played for Glasgow twice against European opposition in season 1996-97. In the European Conference - now the European Challenge Cup - he played for Glasgow away against Newbridge RFC in a 62 - 38 victory; and he played for Glasgow at home against Sale Sharks in a 9-29 defeat.

As the Centre named for Warriors first match as a professional team - against Newbridge in the European Challenge Cup - Bassi has the distinction of being given Glasgow Warrior No. 12 for the provincial side.

References 

Scottish rugby union players
Living people
1969 births
Glasgow Warriors players
Glasgow Hawks players
Glasgow High Kelvinside RFC players
Glasgow District (rugby union) players
Rugby union fullbacks